María Isabel Pérez Santos (born 10 September 1966) is a Mexican politician from the Institutional Revolutionary Party. From 2009 to 2012 he served as Deputy of the LXI Legislature of the Mexican Congress representing Veracruz, and previously served as municipal president of Los Reyes from 2001 to 2004.

References

1966 births
Living people
Politicians from Veracruz
Women members of the Chamber of Deputies (Mexico)
Institutional Revolutionary Party politicians
21st-century Mexican politicians
21st-century Mexican women politicians
Deputies of the LXI Legislature of Mexico
Members of the Chamber of Deputies (Mexico) for Veracruz
Universidad Popular Autónoma del Estado de Puebla alumni
Municipal presidents in Veracruz